Portland is a former railway station in the town of Portland, Victoria Australia.

History
The original station was on the waterfront, and was closed on 6 May 1968. A new Portland station and goods yard, located at the former Portland North station site, about 1600 m further inland, commenced operations on the same day. The change was due to alterations to the local rail facilities as part of the modernisation of the Port of Portland.
 
The last passenger train between Ararat and Portland ran on 12 September 1981, operated by a DRC railcar.

All signals at the closed station were abolished in 1986. The signal panel, which was located at the Portland Harbour Junction, was relocated to the depot building during that time.

References

External links
 Portland Vicrail
 Portland Vicsig

Portland, Victoria